Barace may refer to,

 Baracé, France
 Barace (Bacare), an ancient port in southern India; sometimes identified with modern Purakkad, Kerala state
 Barace (surname)